The  is a handheld digital pet that was created in Japan by Akihiro Yokoi of WiZ and Aki Maita of Bandai. It was released by Bandai on November 23, 1996 in Japan and in the USA on May 1, 1997, quickly becoming one of the biggest toy fads of the late 1990s and the early 2000s. , over  units have been sold worldwide. Most Tamagotchi are housed in a small egg-shaped handheld video game with an interface consisting of three buttons, with the Tamagotchi Pix adding a shutter on the top to activate the camera.

According to Bandai, the name is a portmanteau combining the two Japanese words , which means "egg", and  "watch". After the original English spelling of watch, the name is sometimes romanized as Tamagotch without the "i" in Japan.

History

Tamagotchi was invented by Aki Maita and Akihiro Yokoi in 1996. They both won the 1997 Ig Nobel Prize for economics, dubbing them the father and mother of tamagotchi. Tamagotchi is a keychain-sized virtual pet simulation game.  The characters are colorful creatures with simple designs based on animals, objects, or people. In 2004, beginning with the Tamagotchi Plus/Connection, a second wave of Tamagotchi toys emerged, featuring a different graphic design by artist JINCO and gameplay which elaborated upon the first generations. However, the story behind the games remained the same: Tamagotchis are a small alien species that deposited an egg on Earth to see what life was like, and it is up to the player to raise the egg into an adult creature. The creature goes through several stages of growth, and will develop differently depending on the care the player provides, with better care resulting in an adult creature that is smarter, happier, and requires less attention. Gameplay can vary widely between models, and some models, such as TamagoChu, require little to no care from the player.

When releasing the Tamagotchi in Japan, Bandai initially marketed them exclusively to teenage girls. Bandai and WiZ would later create a masculine counterpart to the Tamagotchi, the Digital Monster, which would spawn the Digimon franchise.

Gameplay
Upon activating the pet, an egg appears on the screen. After setting the clock on the device, the egg will wiggle for several minutes, and then hatch into a small pet. In later versions, inputting the player's name and birthday is also required when setting the clock, and at birth, the player can name the pet and learn of its family group and/or gender. The player can care for the pet as much or as little as they choose, and the outcome depends on the player's actions.  The first Tamagotchis could only be paused by going to set the clock, effectively stopping the passage of time in the game, but in later models, a pause function was included.

Pets have a Hunger meter, Happy meter and a Training meter to determine how healthy and well-behaved the pet is. There is also an age and weight check function for the current age and weight of the pet. Filling up the Hunger meter can be achieved by feeding the pet a meal (usually a loaf of bread or hamburger) or a snack (usually a piece of candy or cake). Filling up the Happy meter can be achieved by playing mini-games with the pet or by feeding it a snack (there are no limits to this, but there are limits to how many meals can be fed). Mini-games usually vary between versions. The Discipline meter can be filled by pressing the "scold" option when a pet calls for attention but refuses to play or be fed a meal. The pet will leave droppings around the screen from time to time and can become sick if they are not cleaned up. Before the pet goes to the bathroom, it will make a face and stink lines will appear around it. If the player activates the toilet icon during this animation, but before the pet has gone to the bathroom, the pet will use a toilet instead. When done repeatedly, the pet can be potty trained. The training meter can be filled by good care. When the Training meter is maxed, the pet will evolve instantly, no matter what age it is.

If the pet gets sick, a skull icon appears next to the pet as it sits still at the bottom of the screen, with an unhappy expression. The pet can become sick for a number of reasons, such as overfeeding of snacks or failing to clean up droppings. The pet can die if sickness is left unchecked. The pet can be cured by pressing the "Medicine" option, however, it may need to be pressed more than once. Usually, a pet will not play or accept a meal when sick.

Life cycle
The pet goes through several distinct stages of development throughout its life cycle. Each stage lasts a set amount of days, depending on the model of the toy, and when it reaches a new stage, the toy plays a jingle, and the pet's appearance changes.  The pet can "die" due to poor care, old age, sickness, and in a few versions, predators. The pet's life cycle stages are Baby, Child, Teenager, Adult and Special. There formerly was a Senior stage.  Usually, the pet's age will increase once it has awakened from its sleep time.

Poor care can cause a pet to die, but on certain releases, it can also die of old age. If an old pet dies without producing offspring, the family line has ended. The Japanese Tamagotchi toys usually feature a ghost and headstone when the pet dies, but English language versions have been changed to show an angel at death. There is sometimes more than one death. Pressing the C button shows the age at which the pet died. After the pet dies, a player can restart the game by pressing the A and C buttons at the same time.

Additional features

In recent models, the player earns currency called Gotchi Points while playing games, and can use the currency in an in-game shop to buy different foods, toys, accessories, or even room decorations for the pet.

Connectivity 
Using infrared communication, two players can link their toys and the pets may form friendships, play games, exchange gifts, and even marry. Connectivity was introduced with Osutchi and Mesutchi. The Japanese Keitai Kaitsuu Tamagotchi Plus was the first model to have an application , Since then, many subsequent models have also been able to interact with apps like Tamatown by using alphanumeric codes generated by the toy to log into the website's Flash game.  After generating a code, the toy remains paused until the player either enters a logout code or cancels.  The player may play minigames in the town to earn Gotchi Points, or use Gotchi Points to buy items in the town shops.  To transfer points and items back to the toy, the player signs out of the Flash game and is given a code to input back into the toy. Newer models, such as the Tamagotchi 4U and the Tamagotchi 4U+ can connect to other Tamagotchi 4U units, as well as smartphones and tablets, using near-field communication. Unlike previous models, the Tamagotchi 4U does not have infrared, which consequently caused it to sell rather poorly.

Marriage and family 
The Mesutchi and Osutchi Tamagotchis were the first to introduce marriages and offspring, and the feature returned in the Plus/Connection and subsequent models.  Two players with a male and female pet may link their toys and allow the pets to develop a friendship and fall in love.  Once the pets have raised their relationship meter sufficiently, the pets may marry. The player can also choose to have their pet marry a random pet brought in by the "Matchmaker."  Once married, the female will eventually produce two eggs, keeping one and leaving one with the male. Since the parent will automatically guide the baby's life, the only care it needs from the player is medicine in the case of sickness. After 24 hours has passed or the offspring evolves into a child the parent will leave, and the player is left to care for a new generation. This can continue for as long as the player manages to care for the pets.

The Chou Jinsei Enjoy Tamagotchi also introduced the idea of character "families" or "groups."  These "families" are a kind of classification for characters obtainable in the game, grouped mainly by appearance, though they are also associated with certain skills. A character of one group cannot grow into an adult of a different group, and if two pets of different groups marry and have an egg, the baby will be of the female's group. Tamagotchi M!X has a notable change to this feature; in this release, Tamagotchi offspring will share genetics from both of their parents.

Other 
With the many different versions of the toy, there are other less common mechanics that influence the pet's growth, including but not limited to friendship with the player, varying types of skills, and career.
The Chou Jinsei Enjoy Tamagotchi also introduced Skills, which can be built by playing certain games with the pet, or using certain toys or foods bought from the E-Tamago or in-game shops.  Having certain skills can help the pet obtain a career, and if built up high enough, can unlock special characters.

The Tamagotchi Pix has a camera installed, allowing the user to get a pet based on the skin tone and age of the face, it also allows the user to take pictures and "take" the pet on a walk.

Releases

As of 2009, there have been over 44 Tamagotchi versions released since their creation, several of which were only released in Japan. Along with the original Tamagotchi, the first wave of Tamagotchi toys included Christmas, angel, and ocean themed versions. The newer versions began in 2004 with the Tamagotchi Plus, and the most recent version in  Japan is Tamagotchi Smart, and in the west it's Tamagotchi Pix.

By Spring 1998, nearly  units were sold worldwide, including  in Japan and nearly  overseas. In the first two years following Tamagotchi's release, Bandai had sold  units. By 2010, over 76 million Tamagotchis had been sold worldwide. By 2017, over  units had been sold worldwide. , Bandai Namco has sold  Tamagotchi units.

In early 2013, Bandai released an enhanced version of the original Tamagotchi as a free iOS and Android app named "Tamagotchi L.i.f.e.". A sequel to the game, "Tamagotchi L.i.f.e. Angel", was released on February 26, 2014.
"Tamagotchi ON" is the first color Tamagotchi to be released internationally.

Bandai released various special editions favored by collectors, some of them being "Tamagochi: Neon Genesis Evangelion" or "Tamagochi: Gudetama", which came out in 2020.

Video games
Since its debut, Tamagotchi has made its way onto several gaming platforms.  Several early games feature gameplay similar to the original toys. A few party-style games appeared on major consoles, along with the Corner Shop series of simulation games and a few role playing games for the Nintendo DS.

Arcade
The character Mametchi makes an appearance in Namco Bandai/Nintendo's Mario Kart Arcade GP 2 as a playable character, along with his pet, Bagubagutchi, as an item. Mametchi and Yumemitchi also appeared in the arcade game Taiko no Tatsujin as unlockable costumes.

An arcade machine known as TamaStation is available in Japan from which players can win prizes for their Tamagotchi toy. This machine has several sequels, such as TamaStation 2.

Marketing and other media

Film
On June 5, 2007, it was announced by Reuters that an animated Tamagotchi film was to be released in December 2007. The film, Tamagotchi: The Movie, focuses on Mametchi, along with his friends Memetchi and Kuchipatchi. Introduced are Tanpopo, a human girl who Mametchi accidentally transports to the Tamagotchi Planet; and Chamametchi, the younger sister of Mametchi who is born during the film's events. Tamagotchi: The Movie was released on December 15, 2007, and was distributed by Toho Co. The film opened at number 3 at the box office on opening weekend. On May 31, 2008, North American distributor Bandai Entertainment announced they had acquired the rights to the film. The movie's first English release was a direct-to-DVD version, released on June 3, 2009 in Australia by Madman Entertainment. The UK DVD was released on September 14, 2009 via Manga Entertainment.

On December 20, 2008, a second film, known as Tamagotchi: Happiest Story in the Universe! was released into theaters. This film, introducing a new Tamagotchi known as Hapihapitchi, was later released on DVD, on June 26, 2009. Unlike the first film, no English dub was ever released on any home video formats, but an English dub aired on television in the Philippines. Madman Entertainment intended to dub Happiest Story in the Universe!, but the dub was cancelled for unknown reasons.

On November 1, 2016, Bandai announced a new Tamagotchi short film called Tamagotchi: Secret Delivery Operation. The film was theatrically released alongside the Kamisama Minarai: Himitsu no Cocotama film on April 28, 2017, and was included in the Cocotama movie's DVD released on December 6, 2017. The short film once again follows Mametchi and his friends, assigned to make an essential delivery to the Gotchi King when a giant mechanical claw controlled by the Spacy Brothers intervenes with the delivery.

In the 2022 film Turning Red, which was set in 2002, the main protagonist Meilin "Mei" Lee owns a Tamagotchi that she names "Robaire Junior", after one of the members of her favorite band. This was inspired by director Domee Shi's desire to have a Tamagotchi when she was younger.

Video games

In Call of Duty: Modern Warfare (2019), there is a purchasable item that is similar to a Tamagotchi in wristwatch form, called the Tomogunchi. The item contains a virtual animal that hatches and evolves through the player getting kills, winning matches, and completing other gameplay objectives.

A Tamagotchi also appears as a character and item in Chibi-Robo!. It's a gift the player can give to Mr. Sanderson after completing the main story by following one of Captain Plankbeard's treasure maps.. Chibi-Robo! was co-developed by Bandai, therefore allowing the product to appear without any legal issues.
 
In the mobile online shooter Pixel Gun 3D, the game introduced a weapon in the “Summer Party” season called the Tamagotchi Revolver, a small pink gun of the Back Up category with a Tamagotchi on it. In the season, there is a mission in the Elite Challenges which requires the player to kill 90 players with the weapon in Team Fight mode.

Anime
A Japanese-only anime series called Anime TV de Hakken!! Tamagotchi (アニメ TVで発見!! たまごっち, lit. "Found on Anime TV!! Tamagotchi") aired from July 7, 1997 to March 21, 1998 on Fuji TV.

In December 2007, Bandai Japan began airing Saa Ikō! Tamagotchi (さぁイコー！たまごっち) a week before the release of the first film. In December 2008, Bandai America dubbed the series, Let's Go! Tamagotchi, and began streaming it on YouTube in both English and Japanese, with captions for up to seven other languages.

In 2009, another anime television series was announced, called Tamagotchi! (たまごっち!). It began in October 2009 and ended in March 2015. A short-lived English dub of the Tamagotchi anime aired in Australia on channel GO! from 2010 to 2014; only the first 26 episodes have been dubbed and have been repeated until 2014, when GO! took the anime out of their channel. The anime has been dubbed in Tagalog in the Philippines, with said dub airing on GMA Network. There is also a dub in Taiwan airing on YoYo TV.

From November 23, 2013 to December 2014, Bandai America has been adapting the second Tamagotchi anime, Tamagotchi! Yume Kira Dream, into "webisodes" promoting the latest addition to the franchise outside Japan, Tamagotchi Friends.

Animated video
An animated video, Tamagotchi Video Adventures, was produced by 7th Level, Inc. in association with Bandai in 1997.  Directed by Dan Kuenster, produced by Susan Deming and written by Kuenster, Deming and David Lewman. It runs approximately 42 and a half minutes long. Cosmotchi sends the Tamagotchi to Earth to collect an object that best exemplifies the planet for the Tamagotchi Museum. An original animated music video ("What's a Tamagotchi?") and a how-to-draw Tamagotchi featurette, starring director Kuenster follow the movie.

Music

 Momus's 1997 album Ping Pong features a song called "Tamagotchi Press Officer", which mocked Bandai's advertising strategy.
 The song "Tamagotchi (Tschoopapa...)" was produced by the music band Sqeezer in 1997.
 In Japan, the band Kigurumi, after gaining new members and becoming a trio, released their single "Tamagotchi" on November 21, 2007, which was also the theme music for the film. It was dubbed in English along with the English dub of the movie.
 The Eurodance group Daze song entitled "Together Forever" uses many Tamagotchi references.
 The Los Angeles-based pop duo LOONER released their tribute to the toy in May 2009 with the single "I Love My Tamagotchee!".
 The Filipino band Eraserheads made a song called "Tamagotchi Baby" on their Aloha Milkyway album.
 The German band "Die Ärzte" also made a song called "Tamagotchi".
 The French singer Lorie made a song called "La TamaDance" in 2014 to the contest TamaDance.
 Tamagotchi!, the anime based on Tamagotchi, also features numerous original songs, most of which are performed by the Japanese voice actress Kei Shindō as the pop idol character Lovelitchi.
 Polish rapper duo Taconafide (Taco Hemingway and Quebonafide) released their song Tamagotchi in 2018; it has reached the position 1 on many Polish charts.

Reception
The success of the Tamagotchi led to the electronic pet being appointed the Christmas Gift of the Year by the Swedish Retail Institute in November 1997.

Criticism and controversies
During the late 1990s, children frequently took Tamagotchi digital pets to school because in the first two releases (Generation 1 and Generation 2), a character could die in less than half a day if it did not receive adequate care. Teachers expressed concerns over class disruption as well as general distraction from schoolwork and this eventually led many schools to ban the product. Children became emotional at the deaths of their Tamagotchi, leading to teenagers sending them to graveyards for burial and urban legends of teen suicide, such as an alleged case of a teenage girl hanging herself over the death of her Tamagotchi after her parents took it away as a punishment.

See also
Digimon — a similar digital pet by Bandai
Giga Pet — a brand of virtual pets released by Tiger Electronics to compete with the Tamagotchi
Fin Fin on Teo the Magic Planet — a similar digital pet game
List of Tamagotchi releases
Pixel Chix — a similar toy aimed at girls
Pou — a Tamagotchi clone where the user cares for a simulated creature
Tamagotchi effect — A psychological effect named after the digital pet
Tuttuki Bako — a similar Bandai release
Pokémon Pikachu — a similar line of digital pets by Nintendo

References

External links

 

 
Bandai Namco Entertainment franchises
1990s toys
2000s toys
2010s toys
2020s toys
Handheld virtual pets
1990s fads and trends
2000s fads and trends
2010s fads and trends
2020s fads and trends
Fictional life forms
Products introduced in 1996
1996 establishments in Japan
1997 establishments in the United States
Toy controversies